The Czech Indoor Athletics Championships is an annual indoor track and field competition organised by the Czech Athletics Federation, which serves as the national championship for the sport in the Czech Republic. Typically held over two days in February during the Czech winter, it was added to the national calendar in 1993, the year of the dissolution of Czechoslovakia. The main outdoor Czech Athletics Championships was held for the first time in the summer that year. The Czech Indoor Combined Events Championships are usually held separately from the other track and field events.

Events
The following athletics events feature as standard on the Czech Indoor Championships programme:

Sprints: 60 m, 200 m, 400 m
Distance track events: 800 m, 1500 m, 3000 m
Hurdles: 60 m hurdles
Jumps: long jump, triple jump, high jump, pole vault
Throws: shot put
Racewalking: 5000 m (men), 3000 m (women)
Combined events: heptathlon (men), pentathlon (women)

A men's 5000 metres race walk and a women's 3000 metres race walk were held at the first two editions in 1993 and 1994, but was dropped from the programme thereafter. The women's pole vault was not held at the first edition.

Editions

Championships records

Women

References

External links
Czech Athletics official website

 
Athletics competitions in the Czech Republic
National indoor athletics competitions
Recurring sporting events established in 1993
1993 establishments in the Czech Republic
February sporting events